Clubmoor railway station was located on the North Liverpool Extension Line at Broad Lane, Norris Green, Liverpool, England.

The passengers only station opened on 14 April 1927 as part of the Cheshire line link from Halewood to Southport. It closed on 7 November 1960.

The tracks through the station continued to be used by freight trains until 1975. They were lifted in early 1979.

Today the wall at the main entrance on the west side of the line and remnants of station platforms and fence posts survive. The base of the waiting shelters can also be seen. The trackbed now forms part of the Trans Pennine Trail which runs from Kingston upon Hull to Southport.

References

Sources

External links
The station via Disused Stations UK
Station on a 1948 O.S. map via npe Maps
Station and line HTS via railwaycodes
The trackbed via Sustrans

Disused railway stations in Liverpool
Former Cheshire Lines Committee stations
Railway stations in Great Britain opened in 1927
Railway stations in Great Britain closed in 1960